Netzarim Junction is a road junction on the Gaza Strip's main north–south highway, close to the former Israeli settlement of Netzarim, at which the following incidents took place:

 Killing of Muhammad al-Durrah
 Netzarim Junction bicycle bombing